Teng or Tengshe (lit. "soaring snake") is a flying dragon in Chinese mythology.

Names
This legendary creature's names include teng  "a flying dragon" (or te  "a plant pest") and tengshe  "flying-dragon snake" or  "soaring snake".

Teng
The Chinese character  for teng or te graphically combines a phonetic element of zhen  "I, we (only used by emperors)" with the "insect radical" . This radical is typically used in characters for insects, worms, reptiles, and dragons (e.g., shen  "a sea-monster dragon" or jiao  "an aquatic dragon"). The earliest written form of teng  is a (ca. 3rd century BCE) Seal script character written with the same radical and phonetic.

Teng  has two etymologically cognate Chinese words written with this zhen  phonetic and different radicals: teng  (with the "water radical" ) "gush up; inundate; Teng (state); a surname" and teng  (with the "horse radical" ) "jump; gallop; prance; mount; ascend; fly swiftly upward; soar; rise". This latter teng, which is used to write the  tengshe flying dragon, occurs in draconic 4-character idioms such as longtenghuyue  (lit. "dragon rising tiger leaping") "scene of bustling activity" and tengjiaoqifeng  ("rising dragon soaring phoenix", also reversible) "a rapidly rising talent; an exceptional literary/artistic talent; a genius".

The (3rd–2nd centuries BCE) Erya dictionary (16) defines teng  as tengshe  "teng-snake", and Guo Pu's commentary glosses it as a "[feilong ] flying dragon that drifts in the clouds and mist".

Some bilingual Chinese dictionaries translate teng as "wingless dragon", but this apparent ghost meaning is not found in monolingual Chinese sources. For instance, the Wiktionary and the Unihan Database translation equivalent for teng  is "mythological wingless dragon of" . This dangling "of" appears to be copied from Robert Henry Mathews's dictionary "A wingless dragon of the clouds", which adapted Herbert Giles's dictionary "A wingless dragon which inhabits the clouds and is regarded as a creature of evil omen." While dragons are depicted as both winged and wingless (e.g., the lindworm "a bipedal wingless dragon"), Chinese dictionaries note teng "flying serpents" are wuzu  "footless; legless" (see the Xunzi below) not "wingless".

Tengshe

"The teng  dragon", says Carr, "had a semantically more transparent name of tengshe  'rising/ascending snake'." Tengshe is written with either teng  "flying dragon" or teng  "soaring; rising" and she  "snake; serpent".

From the original "flying dragon; flying serpent" denotation, tengshe acquired three additional meanings: "an asterism" in Traditional Chinese star names, "a battle formation" in Chinese military history, and "lines above the mouth" in physiognomy.

First, Tengshe  Flying Serpent (or Tianshe  "Heavenly Snake") is an asterism of 22 stars in the Chinese constellation Shi  Encampment, which is the northern 6th of the 7 Mansions in the Xuanwu  Black Tortoise constellation. These Tengshe stars spread across corresponding Western constellations of Andromeda, Lacerta, Cassiopeia, Cepheus, and Cygnus. In traditional Chinese art, Xuanwu is usually represented as a tortoise surrounded by a dragon or snake.

Second, Tengshe names "a battle formation". The (643–659 CE) Beishi history of Emperor Wencheng of Northern Wei Dynasty (r. 452–465 CE) describes a 454 CE battle. The Wei army routed enemy soldiers by deploying troops into over ten columns that changed between feilong "flying dragons", tengshe  "ascending snakes", and yuli  "beautiful fishes" (alluding to Shijing 170).

Third, Tengshe "flying dragon" has a specialized meaning in Xiangshu  "Chinese physiognomy", referring to "vertical lines rising from corners of the mouth".

Te
The earliest occurrence of  means te "a plant pest" instead of teng "a flying dragon". The (ca. 6th century BCE) Shijing (212 ) describes farmers removing plant pests called mingte  and maozei  in fields of grain. These Shijing names rhyme, and Bernhard Karlgren reconstructed them as Old Chinese *d'ək  and *dz'ək . The Mao Commentary glosses four insects; the ming  eats hearts, the te  eats leaves, the mao  eats roots, and the zei  eats joints. Compare these translations:
We remove the insects that eat the heart and the leaf, And those that eat the roots and the joints
Avaunt, all earwigs and pests
We remove the noxious insects from the ears and leaves, and the grubs from roots and stems

Han Dynasty Chinese dictionaries write te  "a plant pest" with the variant Chinese character . The Erya defines ming  as "[insect that] eats seedlings and cores" and te  "[insect that] eats leaves". Guo Pu's commentary glosses these four pests as types of huang  "locusts; grasshoppers". The (121 CE) Shuowen Jiezi dictionary defines ming "insect that eats grain leaves" and te as "insect that eats sprout leaves".

The identity of this rare te  or  "a grain pest" called remains uncertain. In Modern Standard Chinese usage, te only occurs as a literary archaism, while ming is used in words like mingling  "corn earworm; adopted son" and mingchong  "snout moth's larva".

Classical usages
Chinese classic texts frequently mention tengshe  or  "flying dragons". The examples below are roughly arranged in chronological order, although some heterogeneous texts are of uncertain dates. Only texts with English translations are cited, excluding tengshe occurrences in texts such as the Guiguzi, Shuoyuan, and Shiji.

Xunzi
The (c. 4th century BCE) Confucianist Xunzi (1 ) first records the Classical Chinese idiom tengshe wuzu er fei  "flying dragon is without feet yet flies", which figuratively means "success results from concentrating on one's abilities". 
The T'eng-she dragon has no feet but flies; the squirrel have five talents, but cannot perform any one of them to perfection.
The wingless dragon has no limbs, but it can fly; the flying squirrel has five talents, but it is reduced to extremity.

Hanfeizi
The (3rd century BCE) Legalist text Hanfeizi uses tengshe  in two chapters.

"Ten Faults", uses it describing the Yellow Emperor's heavenly music.
In by-gone days the Yellow Emperor once called a meeting of devils and spirits at the top of the Western T'ai Mountain, he rode in a divine carriage pulled by [] dragons, with Pi-fang a tree deity keeping pace with the linchpin, Ch'ih-yu [a war deity] marching in the front, Earl Wind [a wind deity] sweeping the dirt, Master Rain [a rain deity] sprinkling water on the road, tigers and wolves leading in the front, devils and spirits following from behind, rising serpents rolling on the ground, and male and female phoenixes flying over the top. 

The "Critique on the Concept of Political Purchase" (quotes Shen Dao contrasting feilong  "flying dragon" with tengshe  to explain shi  "political purchase; strategic advantage".
Shen Tzu said: "The flying dragon mounts the clouds and the t'eng snake wanders in the mists. But when the clouds dissipate and the mists clear, the dragon and the snake become the same as the earthworm and the large-winged black ant because they have lost that on which they ride. Where men of superior character are subjugated by inferior men, it is because their authority is lacking and their position is low. Where the inferior are subjugated by the superior, it is because the authority of the latter is considerable and their position is high.

Chuci
The (3rd–2nd centuries BCE) Chuci parallels tengshe  with feiju  "flying horse" in the poem "A Road Beyond".
With team of dragons I mount the heavens, In ivory chariot borne aloft. ... I wander through all the constellations; I roam about round the Northern Pole. My upper garment is of red stuff; Of green silk is my under-robe. I loosen my girdle and let my clothes flow freely; I stretch out my trusty Gan-jiang sword. The Leaping Serpent follows behind me, the Flying Horse trots at my side.

Huainanzi

"The Art of Rulership" (9 ), uses tengshe  with yinglong  "responding dragon". The t'eng snake springs up into the mist; the flying ying dragon ascends into the sky mounting the clouds; a monkey is nimble in the trees and a fish is agile in the water." 

The "Discourse on Forests" (17) , has tengshe  in the same  "drifts into the mist" phrase, "The ascending snake can drift in the mist, yet it is endangered by the centipede."

Other texts
Tengshe frequently occurs in Chinese poetry. Two early examples are "The Dark Warrior shrinks into his shell; The Leaping Serpent twists and coils itself" ("Rhapsody on Contemplating the Mystery" by Zhang Heng, 78–139 CE, and "Though winged serpents ride high on the mist, They turn to dust and ashes at last" ("Though the Tortoise Lives Long" by Cao Cao, 155–220 CE.

Mythology
The Chinese books above repeatedly parallel the tengshe "soaring snake; flying dragon" with its near synonym feilong "flying dragon". Like the tianlong "heavenly dragon", these creatures are associated with clouds and rainfall, as Visser explains.
The Classics have taught us that the dragon is thunder, and at the same time that he is a water animal akin to the snake, sleeping in pools during winter and arising in spring. When autumn comes with its dry weather, the dragon descends and dives into the water to remain there till spring arrives again. 

The (1578 CE) Bencao Gangmu (43), mentions this mythic serpent, "There are flying snakes without feet such as the 螣蛇 T'eng She." The commentary explains, "The t'eng-she changes into a dragon. This divine snake can ride upon the clouds and fly about over a thousand miles. If it is heard, (this means) pregnancy."

Wolfram Eberhard surveys the cultural background of tengshe "ascending snake" myths.
Frequently, in the early literature, the snake steps into the clouds [Shenzi, Baopuzi, Huainanzi]. Here one suspects that the word dragon was taboo and had to be substituted; this is confirmed by Chung-ch'ang T'ung [Hou Han Shu] stating that the ascending snake loses it scales. One can hardly speak of scales in the case of a real snake, but a dragon was believed to be scaly. Otherwise this flying snake may be compared with the folktale of the fight between centipede and snake which is associated with Thai culture … The dragon-like snake in the sky is again the dragon lung, again of the Thai cultures. Otherwise the "ascending snake" (t'eng-she) may mean a constellation of stars near the Milky Way [Xingjing]. According to Ko Hung [Baopuzi] it makes lightning, and this again equates it with the dragon lung. 

Legends about flying snakes, serpents, and dragons are widespread in comparative mythology, exemplified by the Biblical Fiery flying serpent. Snakes in the genus Chrysopelea are commonly known as "flying snakes".

References
  Internet Archive.

Footnotes

External links

螣 entry, Chinese Etymology

Chinese dragons